Ann Barford is a former female rugby union player. She was a member of the 1991 Women's Rugby World Cup champion squad.

She is the Director of IT at Corning Inc. She has a Master's degree in Computer Science from New Jersey Institute of Technology and a Bachelor's degree in Chemistry from Douglass College, Rutgers University. She is on the Board of Directors for the USA Rugby Trust.

References

Living people
United States women's international rugby union players
American female rugby union players
Female rugby union players
Year of birth missing (living people)
Place of birth missing (living people)
Rutgers University alumni
New Jersey Institute of Technology alumni
21st-century American women